Robert or Bob Park may refer to:

 Bob Park (earthquake engineer) (1933–2004), New Zealand earthquake engineer
 Robert E. Park (1864–1944), American urban sociologist
 Robert H. Park (1902–1994), American electrical engineer and inventor
 Robert L. Park (born 1931–2020), American physicist
 Robert Park (activist) (born 1981), Korean-American missionary and activist
 Robert Park (American football) (1880–1961), American football coach at Geneva College
 Robert Park (priest) (1885–1971), Archdeacon of Winnipeg

See also
Robert Parks (disambiguation)